The Tawarau River is a river of the southern Waikato Region of New Zealand's North Island. It flows northwest to reach the Marokopa River  from the latter's outflow into the North Taranaki Bight.

See also
List of rivers of New Zealand

References

Rivers of Waikato
Rivers of New Zealand